The North–South Elevated Road is an elevated expressway in the city of Shanghai.

Route
It begins to the south at Jiyang Road in Pudong New Area, crosses the Huangpu River into Puxi using the Lupu Bridge, and then traverses through Puxi to the Outer Ring Expressway in Baoshan District.

Construction
Construction on the first phase of the expressway, from the Lupu Bridge to Liuying Road started on 25 October 1993 and was completed on 10 December 1995.

Construction of the second phase, from Liuying Road to Outer Ring Expressway coincided with the northern extension of Shanghai Metro Line 1. The metro line is the first level above street level, while the expressway is the second level above street level. This phase was completed on 4 December 2002.

Exit list 
 Yaohua Rd
 Tongyao Rd (southbound exit only)
 Inner Ring Road
 Xujiahui Rd
 Huaihai M Rd (SB entrance and Northbound exit)
 Yan'an Elevated Road
 Weihai Rd (SB exit and NB entrance)
 Beijing W Rd, Xinzha Rd
 Tianmu W Rd, Tianmu M Rd
 Zhongxing Rd (SB entrance and NB exit)
 Inner Ring Rd CW (No SB exit)
 Inner Ring Rd CCW
 Yanchang Rd (SB entrance and NB exit)
 Middle Ring Road
 Wenshui Rd 
 Jiangchang W Rd(NB exit only)
 Linfen Rd (SB entrance and NB exit)
 Gongjiang Rd, Changjiang W Rd, Huma Rd
 Lianyi Rd
 S20 Outer Ring Expressway
 Taihe Rd, Taihe W Rd (SB exit and NB entrance)

References 

Road transport in Shanghai